Anita Kravos (born 2 April 1974) is an Italian actress. Her acting credits include Alza la testa, Raise Your Head and The Great Beauty.

In 2010 she has been nominated to the David di Donatello for Best Supporting Actress thanks to her performance in Alza la testa.

Filmography
 Ritratto di un imprenditore di provincia directed by Hermes Cavagnini (2015)
 Seconda primavera directed by Francesco Calogero (director) (2015)
 La accabadora directed by Enrico Pau (2015)
 La vita oscena, Venezia Film Festival directed by Renato De Maria (2014)
 Fuori mira directed by Erik Bernasconi (2014)
 La grande bellezza directed by Paolo Sorrentino (2013)
 Amori elementari directed by Sergio Basso (2013)
 Se chiudo gli occhi non sono più qui directed by Vittorio Moroni (2013)
 Non scomparire! directed by Pietro Reggiani (2013)
 E la chiamano estate directed by Paolo Franchi (director) (2012)
 Italian movies directed by Matteo Pellegrini (2012)
 Ruggine (film) directed by Daniele Gaglianone, (2011)
 Tutto bene directed by Daniele Maggioni (2011)
 I casi della vita directed by Corso Salani (2009)
 Alza la testa directed by Alessandro Angelini (2009)
 La prima linea directed by Renato De Maria (2009)
 Mirna (film) directed by Corso Salani (2009)
 Italians directed by Giovanni Veronesi (2008)
 Segreti e sorelle directed by Francesco Jost (2008)
 Transition directed by Boris Palcic (2008)
 Lamor cortese directed by Claudio Camarca (2008)
 Principessa part time directed by Giorgio Arcelli (2008)
 Amore, bugie e calcetto directed by Luca Lucini (2007)
 La cura directed by Marco Bellocchio (2007)
 Come l'ombra directed by Marina Spada (2006)
 Manuale d'amore 2 directed by Giovanni Veronesi (2006)
 Saimir directed by Francesco Munzi (2005)

External links
 

Living people
Italian film actresses
1974 births